Pukwana is a town in Brule County, South Dakota, United States. The population was 233 at the 2020 census.

Pukwana was laid out in 1881.

In 1955, the local residents made a push to get the new Brule County Courthouse relocated to town, however the city of Chamberlain managed to keep it after battling petitions were made.

Geography

Pukwana is located at  (43.778940, -99.182743).

Pukwana has been assigned the ZIP code 57370 and the FIPS place code 52220.

Demographics

2010 census
As of the census of 2010, there were 285 people, 115 households, and 70 families residing in the town. The racial makeup of the town was 79.6% White, 10.9% Native American, 0.7% Asian, 0.4% from other races, and 8.4% from two or more races. Hispanic or Latino of any race were 4.2% of the population.

There were 115 households, of which 29.6% had children under the age of 18 living with them, 47.8% were married couples living together, 7.8% had a female householder with no husband present, 5.2% had a male householder with no wife present, and 39.1% were non-families. 29.6% of all households were made up of individuals, and 7% had someone living alone who was 65 years of age or older. The average household size was 2.48 and the average family size was 3.19.

The median age in the town was 41.5 years. 26% of residents were under the age of 18; 7% were between the ages of 18 and 24; 21.1% were from 25 to 44; 32% were from 45 to 64; and 14% were 65 years of age or older. The gender makeup of the town was 50.2% male and 49.8% female.

2000 census
As of the census of 2000, there were 287 people, 116 households, and 78 families residing in the town. The population density was 369.6 people per square mile (142.1/km2). There were 131 housing units at an average density of 168.7 per square mile (64.8/km2). The racial makeup of the town was 97.21% White, 2.44% Native American, and 0.35% from two or more races. Hispanic or Latino of any race were 0.70% of the population.

There were 116 households, out of which 31.0% had children under the age of 18 living with them, 53.4% were married couples living together, 10.3% had a female householder with no husband present, and 31.9% were non-families. 29.3% of all households were made up of individuals, and 11.2% had someone living alone who was 65 years of age or older. The average household size was 2.47 and the average family size was 3.10.

In the town, the population was spread out, with 28.9% under the age of 18, 7.7% from 18 to 24, 29.6% from 25 to 44, 22.6% from 45 to 64, and 11.1% who were 65 years of age or older. The median age was 36 years. For every 100 females, there were 102.1 males. For every 100 females age 18 and over, there were 96.2 males.

As of 2000 the median income for a household in the town was $27,500, and the median income for a family was $31,667. Males had a median income of $24,375 versus $15,208 for females. The per capita income for the town was $11,978. About 5.6% of families and 12.1% of the population were below the poverty line, including 17.5% of those under the age of eighteen and 9.4% of those 65 or over.

Climate
This climatic region is typified by large seasonal temperature differences, with warm to hot (and often humid) summers and cold (sometimes severely cold) winters.  According to the Köppen Climate Classification system, Pukwana has a humid continental climate, abbreviated "Dfa" on climate maps.

References

External links
 Pukwana Chamber of Commerce

Towns in Brule County, South Dakota
Towns in South Dakota
Populated places established in 1881
1881 establishments in Dakota Territory